Ethmia epitrocha is a moth in the family Depressariidae. It is found in Japan, China, and Taiwan.

The forewings are overlaid with black markings on a white background, consisting mostly of elongate, rather big black patches. The hindwings are grey without costal brushes. Adults are on wing from March to September.

The larvae feed on Ehretia acuminata.

References

Moths described in 1914
epitrocha
Moths of Japan